The 2016 RAN Women's Sevens Championship was the twelfth tournament of the RAN Women's Sevens, the official rugby sevens continental championships organized by RAN. Both the women's and men's competitions were held at Saint Mary's College, Trinidad and Tobago in Port of Spain on 12–13 November 2016.

Ten national teams competed in the women's tournament. Jamaica as the best placed non-core team qualified to compete at 2017 Hong Kong Women's Sevens to compete for a spot on the World Series.

Pool stage

Pool A

Pool B

Knockout stage

5th-8th Place

Cup

Final standings

The 9th place playoff between Dominican Republic and Turks and Caicos Islands was cancelled.

References

2016
2016 rugby sevens competitions
2016 in North American rugby union
2016 in women's rugby union
International sports competitions hosted by Trinidad and Tobago
rugby union
rugby union